Ramona High School may refer to:

 Ramona High School (Riverside, California)
 Ramona High School (Ramona, California)